Porphyrospiza is a genus of seed-eating South American birds in the tanager family Thraupidae.

Taxonomy and species list
The genus Porphyrospiza was introduced in 1873 by the English ornithologists Philip Sclater and Osbert Salvin to accommodate the blue finch. The genus name combines the Ancient Greek porphura meaning "purple" with spiza meaning "finch". The genus formerly included only a single species, the blue finch. The band-tailed sierra finch and the carbonated sierra finch were formerly placed in the genus Phrygilus. They were moved to Porphyrospiza when a molecular phylogenetic study published in 2014 found that Phrygilus was polyphyletic and that these two species were closely related to the blue finch.

The genus now contains three species:

References

 
Bird genera
Taxa named by Philip Sclater
Taxa named by Osbert Salvin